Lt. Col. Chandrasekhar Vaman Gadkari  (3 February 1928 – 11 January 1998) was an Indian Test cricketer.

Gadkari was an attacking batsman, medium pace bowler and a great fielder. He made a fine impression as a fielder in the 1952/53 tour to West Indies in an Indian side that was noted for its fielding. He made 50* in the Georgetown Test which remained his highest score. His other tour was to Pakistan in 1954/55. Gadkari co-holds the Test record with Shafiq Ahmed for the most matches played in a career without either winning or losing - 6.

He was commissioned into the army in 1949 and rose to become a lieutenant colonel. He represented Services in the Ranji Trophy thereafter. But the army service also restricted his appearances. He died in 1998 after a brief illness.

References
 Obituary in Indian Cricket 1998
 Christopher Martin-Jenkins, The Complete Who's Who of Test Cricketers

External links

1928 births
1998 deaths
Services cricketers
Indian cricketers
India Test cricketers
Maharashtra cricketers
North Zone cricketers
Cricketers from Pune